Sri Senpaga Vinayagar Temple is a temple for the Hindu god Ganesha who is the presiding deity. It is located at Ceylon Road in Singapore.

History
In the 1850s, a statue of Lord Vinayagar was discovered by the side of a pond. A Chempaka tree, Senpaga in Tamil, stood on the bank of the pond. As the Vinayagar statue was found besides the Chempaka tree, the temple came to be known as "Sri Senpaga Vinayagar Temple".

A Ceylon Tamil, Ethirnayagam Pillai (Pillay) pioneered the building of the first structure as a shelter with an attap roof with the help of the nearby Indian workers. This shelter became the temple of Sri Senpaga Vinayagar.

In 1909, the Ceylon Tamils who had grown in number to about 300 families, formed the Singapore Ceylon Tamils’ Association (SCTA). In 1913, a Management Committee of four persons was formed to renovate the premises for the growing number of devotees. In 1923, the SCTA assisted the Temple by purchasing the land on which the Temple stands today. A bigger temple subsequently emerged with a priest (a pandaram) to initiate prayers (poojas) and other religious ceremonies.

In 1923, the SCTA became the official keeper and manager of this autonomous temple.

Consecration ceremonies
In 1930, the first Maha Kumbhabishegam was held with the help of generous donations from the chairman. Many community leaders and devotees permitted the addition of several new shrines within the precincts of the temple. They included shrines for Lord Shiva, Goddess Ambal, and Lords Subramaniam, Vairavar and Nageswarar. On 3 February 1930, a major Consecration (Maha Kumbhabishegam) of the temple was held for the first time.

In 1942, during the Second World War, when a bomb damaged the temple, the restoration began under the chairmanship of P. Thillainathan and six years later on 7 July 1955, devotees witnessed another Consecration Ceremony.

Facilities

The temple has many facilities during the initial construction. The periodic upgrading, inclusive of a three storey extension, of the temple resulted in the addition of classrooms, Halls, Kitchens, library and a wedding hall. The wedding and dining hall was opened on 8 November 1989 by Senior Minister, S. Rajaratnam.

See also
 List of Hindu temples in Singapore

References

External links
Official Website

Hindu temples in Singapore
Indian diaspora in Singapore
Tamil Singaporean
Tourist attractions in Singapore